There are a number of places in the world called Queen's Park or Queens Park.

Australia

New South Wales
 Queens Park, New South Wales, a Sydney suburb
 Queens Park, Sydney, the  urban park, part of Centennial Parklands, located adjacent to the suburb

Queensland
 Queen's Park, Ipswich, a park in Ipswich
 Queens Park, Mackay, park in Mackay City
 Queen's Park, Maryborough in Queensland
Queens Park, Toowoomba
 Queens Gardens, Brisbane, a park in Queensland, often called Queens Park
Queens Gardens, Townsville
Gallop Botanic Reserve, a park in Cooktown, also known as Queens Park

Victoria
 Queens Park, Victoria (disambiguation)
 Queens Park, Newtown, Victoria  Queen's Park Golf Course
 Queens Park, Lorne, Victoria
 Queens Park, Moonee Ponds in Victoria

Western Australia
 Queens Park, Western Australia, suburb
 Queens Park railway station, Perth, train station

Barbados 
 Queen's Park, Bridgetown (Barbados), (1780–1905) residence of the Commanding General of Imperial troops.

Canada 
 Queen's Park (Toronto)
 a metonym for the Ontario Legislative Building, which is located in the park
 a metonym for the Government of Ontario
 the nearby Queen's Park station of the Toronto subway
 Calgary Queens Park, formal provincial electoral district in Alberta
Queen's Park, New Westminster, park and adjoining neighbourhood in British Columbia
Queen's Park Arena, a 3,500 seat indoor arena located within the park.

Grenada 
 Queen's Park, Grenada, a cricket stadium
 Queen's Park (Old), an old cricket stadium

New Zealand 
 Queen's Park, Invercargill, a large park in the center of Invercargill
 Queens Park A.F.C. is a Football (soccer) club based in Invercargill, New Zealand

Trinidad and Tobago 
 Queen's Park Oval, in 2006 it is currently the largest sporting Cricket grounds in the West Indies
 Queen's Park Savannah, a large open park in capital city Port of Spain, also purported to be the largest roundabout in the world

United Kingdom 
 Queens Park, Aylesbury, Buckinghamshire
 Queens Park, Bedford, electoral ward
 Queens Park, Birmingham
 Queen's Park, Bolton, an old park in Bolton
 Queen's Park, Bournemouth, area of Bournemouth including a public park and a golf course
 Queen's Park (Bournemouth ward)
 Queen's Park, Brighton, a political ward and a pleasure park
 Queen's Park (Brighton ward), an administrative ward in Brighton
 Queens Park, Burnley, a public park in Burnley
 Queens Park Centre, in Aylesbury, Buckinghamshire
 Queens Park, Chester, suburb
 Queen's Park, Chesterfield, public park and county cricket ground
 Queen's Park, Crewe, Cheshire, park
 Queen's Park, Edinburgh, a royal park in central Edinburgh, Scotland
 Queen's Park, Glasgow, park and district
 Queens Park railway station (Scotland)
 Queen's Park F.C., a professional football (soccer) club originally from Queen's Park, Glasgow
 Queen's Park F.C. (women), a professional women's football club
 Queen's Park, London, area of London
 Queen's Park station (England), railway and tube station

 Queens Park Rangers F.C., an English football (soccer) club originally from Queen's Park, London
 Queen's Park, Northampton, district
 Queens Park, Swindon, public park
 Queens Park, Wrexham, area and street in Wrexham in North Wales

United States
 Queen's Park, a defunct amusement park in Long Beach, California

See also 
 Queens Gardens (disambiguation)
 Queen's Square (disambiguation)